José G. Saucedo Mendoza (December 5, 1924 – August 7, 1998) was a Mexican Anglican bishop from 1958 to 1997. 

He was the first bishop of Cuernavaca. He was the first archbishop of the Anglican Church of Mexico, serving from 1995 until his retirement in 1997. Under his episcopacy spanning four decades the Anglican Church of Mexico grew from one missionary diocese to five dioceses that formed an independent member of the worldwide Anglican Communion in 1995. As a promoter of access to the priesthood by women, he arranged for the ordination of the first female priest in Latin America. He attended the Episcopal Church's Virginia Theological Seminary, at Alexandria, Virginia.
He was consecrated bishop in 1958 at XVII century church of San Jose de Gracia, Mexico City.

References

1924 births
1998 deaths
20th-century Anglican bishops in Mexico
People from Cuernavaca
Virginia Theological Seminary alumni
Anglican bishops of Cuernavaca
Anglican archbishops of Mexico
Mexican expatriates in the United States